Grit Fell is a lonely hill between Clougha Pike and Ward's Stone in the Forest of Bowland in Lancashire, England. Covered by heather and large bogs, it is difficult walking country. The path from Clougha Pike in the west is better, but still contains bogs crossed by the odd plank of wood. The path from Ward's Stone is the most treacherous of all. Crossing Cabin Flat, it weaves its way across hidden pools of stagnant water, the presence of which is betrayed by a form of red grass.

The summit is fairly inconspicuous, with only cairns and a wall.

References

Hills of the Forest of Bowland
Mountains and hills of Lancashire
Geography of the City of Lancaster